The 2014 |Lotto–Belisol Belgium Tour  is the third edition of the Lotto–Belisol Belgium Tour, previous called Lotto–Decca Tour, a women's cycle stage race in Belgium. The tour was held from 11 to 15 September 2014. The tour has an UCI rating of 2.2.

Ellen van Dijk, who won the two previous editions, did not compete in this edition because the race did not fit in her schedule.

Stages

Prologue
11 September – Naast to Naast,

Stage 1
12 September – Honelles to Honelles,

Stage 2
13 September – Colfontaine to Colfontaine,  Team time trial (TTT)

Stage 3
14 September – Halle to Buizingen,

Stage 4
15 September – Geraardsbergen to Geraardsbergen,

Classification leadership

See also

2014 in women's road cycling

References

External links

Lotto-Belisol Belgium Tour
Lotto-Belisol Belgium Tour
Belgium Tour
Lotto-Decca Tour